Lucia Smyrk is an Australian actress who has appeared in a number of Australian television series, including Short Cuts, in Pirate Islands as Carmen, in Neighbours as Edwina Valdez (2003) and Evie Sullivan (2012).

Smyrk is married to comedian Nick Cody.

References

External links

Australian television actresses
Living people
Year of birth missing (living people)